Roy Hartle (4 October 1931 – 5 November 2014) was an English professional footballer, mainly playing at right-back.

Hartle signed for these clubs during his career: Bolton Wanderers as a sixteen-year-old from non-league Bromsgrove Rovers and went on to become a stalwart, representing the club in 499 games in all competitions. His achievements include a 1958 FA Cup Final winner's medal, playing in the side that beat Manchester United 2–0.

After a spell in the US with the New York Generals as a player/coach, he called time on his playing career and was appointed as Chief Scout at Bury after turning down other job offers with the likes of Stoke City and Grimsby Town.

Appearing in Bolton's Hall of Fame and having a club suite at the Macron Stadium named in his honour, he died on 5 November 2014 at the age of 83, after spending time at a local nursing home following a long illness.

References

External links

Roy Hartle Bolton stats
From the Bolton Evening News

1931 births
2014 deaths
Bolton Wanderers F.C. players
Buxton F.C. players
Bromsgrove Rovers F.C. players
English Football League players
English Football League representative players
Association football fullbacks
People from Worcestershire (before 1974)
Bury F.C. non-playing staff
National Professional Soccer League (1967) players
New York Generals (NPSL) players
English footballers
FA Cup Final players